The men's 100 metres was an event at the 1992 Summer Olympics in Barcelona, Spain. There were a total number of 81 participating athletes from 66 nations, with ten qualifying heats (three qualified plus two fastest losers). Each nation was limited to 3 athletes per rules in force since the 1930 Olympic Congress.

The gold medal was won by Great Britain's Linford Christie, who had originally won the bronze medal in 1988 but was elevated to silver following the disqualification of original gold medalist Ben Johnson for using stanozolol. Silver went to Namibia's Frankie Fredericks, who also finished second in the 200 metres in Barcelona, while Dennis Mitchell of the United States of America won the bronze. Namibia had never competed in the men's 100 metres before, so Fredericks's medal was that nation's first in the event; it was also the first medal by an African country in the event since 1908 (when Reggie Walker of South Africa won gold).

Background

This was the twenty-second time the event was held, having appeared at every Olympics since the first in 1896. The gold and bronze medalists from 1988, Americans Carl Lewis (the two-time defending gold medalist as well as three-time reigning world champion, struck by infection at the U.S. trials) and Calvin Smith, did not return, but British silver medalist Linford Christie (reigning Commonwealth and European champion) did. So did fourth-place finisher American Dennis Mitchell (who had taken bronze at the 1991 world championships), Brazilian fifth-place finisher Robson da Silva, Jamaican seventh-place finisher Ray Stewart, and the disqualified original champion, Canadian Ben Johnson. World championship runner-up American Leroy Burrell was also present in 1992.

The Cayman Islands, the Central African Republic, the Cook Islands, Cyprus, Gabon, Grenada, Honduras, Mauritania, Namibia, and Niger appeared in the event for the first time. It was also the only appearance of the Unified Team, following the breakup of the Soviet Union. Romania appeared independently for the first time since 1928. The United States made its 21st appearance in the event, most of any country, having missed only the boycotted 1980 Games.

Competition format

The event retained the same basic four round format introduced in 1920: heats, quarterfinals, semifinals, and a final. The "fastest loser" system, introduced in 1968, was used again to ensure that the quarterfinals and subsequent rounds had exactly 8 runners per heat; this time, the system was used in only the preliminaries.

The first round consisted of 10 heats, each with 8 athletes except the last (with 9). The top three runners in each heat advanced, along with the next two fastest runners overall. This made 32 quarterfinalists, who were divided into 4 heats of 8 runners. The top four runners in each quarterfinal advanced, with no "fastest loser" places. The 16 semifinalists competed in two heats of 8, with the top four in each semifinal advancing to the eight-man final.

Records

These were the standing world and Olympic records (in seconds) prior to the 1992 Summer Olympics.

Results

Heats

Heat 1

Heat 2

Heat 3

Heat 4

Heat 5

Heat 6

Heat 7

Heat 8

Heat 9

Heat 10

Quarterfinals

Quarterfinal 1

Quarterfinal 2

Quarterfinal 3

Quarterfinal 4

Semifinals

Semifinal 1

Semifinal 2

Final

The final was held on August 1, 1992.
Wind: +0.5m/s

See also
 1991 Men's World Championships 100 metres
 1993 Men's World Championships 100 metres

References

External links
 Official Report
 Results

 
100 metres at the Olympics
Men's events at the 1992 Summer Olympics